Tun Endon binti Mahmood Ambak (Jawi: هند بنت محمود أعماق ; 24 December 1940 – 20 October 2005) was the first wife of the 5th Prime Minister of Malaysia, Tun Abdullah Ahmad Badawi. She died from breast cancer on 20 October 2005.

Early life
Endon was born to Datuk Mahmood Ambak, a Malay man, and Datin Mariam Abdullah, a Japanese woman. Endon had ten other siblings, including her twin sister Noraini as well as other sisters Nonni, Rahmah and Aizah. She was born in Klang, Selangor on 24 December 1940.

Endon's father worked as a mining assistant in the Department of Mines, and subsequently transferred to Perak to help oversee about 60 mines in the district of Kampar. Endon spent much of her childhood days in Kampar and received her early education at the Anglo-Chinese School, now Methodist National Type Primary School. She later went on to attend St Mary's secondary school in Kuala Lumpur.

Marriage
Endon met Abdullah while she was working at the Federal Establishment Office (now the Public Service Department) in the 1960s and they were married in 1965. Endon later retired from civil service in 1976. Together with Abdullah, Endon had two children: son Datuk Kamaluddin Abdullah, a business tycoon (married to Azrene) and a daughter, Nori Abdullah (married to Khairy Jamaluddin). Both Abdullah and Endon had four grandchildren.

Social contributions

Endon is noted for her contributions to traditional fabric art such as the batik and songket. For example, she launched Campaigns and exhibitions such as the "Batik Extravaganza" which was held in early December 2003 and the Malaysian Batik Movement, "Creation for the World". She was also a patron of the theatre.

Illness and Death
Endon underwent a radical mastectomy on 18 April 2002, which was followed by 33 sessions of radiation and a series of physiotherapy sessions at St. John's Medical Center, Los Angeles, California. She discovered she had breast cancer in 2003 while her twin sister Noraini who had earlier been diagnosed with the disease died in January 2003. She left for St. John's Medical Center in Los Angeles, California for treatment, returning again in June 2005 for chemotherapy. She returned to Malaysia on 2 October 2005. She was later brought home to Seri Perdana to be with her family after spending two weeks in Putrajaya Hospital. On 20 October 2005, aged 64, Endon died after a long battle with breast cancer. The funeral was conducted at the Prime Minister's residence and the Putra Mosque (where the funeral prayers are conducted), both in Putrajaya. Endon was buried at the Muslim cemetery in Taman Selatan, Precinct 20, Putrajaya.

Honours
Universiti Teknologi Malaysia conferred Endon Mahmood the Honorary Doctorate in Humanities in August 2004.

Endon Mahmoud was conferred the Tun Fatimah Award by the National Council of Women's Organisations on 24 August 2004 for her service to the community. She was posthumously conferred the Seri Setia Mahkota Malaysia (SSM) which carries the title 'Tun' on 6 June 2009 in conjunction with the birthday of the Yang di-Pertuan Agong Tuanku Mizan Zainal Abidin.

Honour of Malaysia
  :
  Grand Commander of the Order of Loyalty to the Crown of Malaysia (S.S.M.) - Tun  (2009)
 :
  Knight Grand Commander of the Order of the Crown of Selangor (S.P.M.S.) – Datin Paduka Seri (2002)
  :
  Grand Knight of the Order of Sultan Ahmad Shah of Pahang (S.S.A.P.) – Dato' Sri (2002)
  :
  Knight Grand Commander of the Order of the Crown of Kelantan (S.P.M.K.) – Dato' (2004)
  :
  Knight Grand Commander of the Most Blessed Grand Order of Tuanku Jaafar (S.P.T.J.) – Dato' Seri (2005)

Places named after her
Several places and honours were named after her, including:
 Kolej Datin Seri Endon, a residential college at Universiti Teknologi Malaysia, Skudai, Johor.
 Piala Seri Endon, batik and kebaya competition.

See also
 Spouse of the Prime Minister of Malaysia

References

External links

 
 
 
 1,849 conferred royal awards on King's birthday The Star (Malaysia), 6 June 2009

1940 births
2005 deaths
Deaths from breast cancer
Malaysian people of Japanese descent
Malaysian people of Malay descent
Spouses of prime ministers of Malaysia
Spouses of Deputy Prime Ministers of Malaysia
Deaths from cancer in Malaysia
Malaysian Muslims
Grand Commanders of the Order of Loyalty to the Crown of Malaysia
Knights Grand Commander of the Order of the Crown of Selangor